Black Sheep is an American hip hop duo from Queens, New York, United States, composed of Andres "Dres" Vargas Titus and William "Mista Lawnge" McLean. The duo was from New York but met as teenagers in Sanford, North Carolina, where both of their families relocated. The group was part of the Native Tongues collective, which included the Jungle Brothers, A Tribe Called Quest, and De La Soul. After getting together in 1989, Black Sheep debuted in 1991 with the hit song "Flavor of the Month" and later released its first album, A Wolf in Sheep's Clothing, which gained them praise and recognition in the hip-hop community for the album's unique rhythms and intelligent, often humorous lyrics. After six years together, Black Sheep disbanded in 1995, citing creative differences.

Biography

Initial career and break up (1989–1995)
Black Sheep was formed in 1989 by Andres "Dres" Vargas Titus and William "Mista Lawnge" McLean. While working as a DJ in New York, McLean met Mike Gee of the Jungle Brothers and DJ Red Alert, who encouraged him to start his own hip hop group. He recruited Dres, who he had grown up with in North Carolina. Black Sheep was the first hip-hop act to appear on The Tonight Show with Jay Leno after the departure of Johnny Carson. Their first official appearance as Black Sheep was on De La Soul's 1991 album De La Soul Is Dead. Dres was featured on the track "Fanatic of the B Word".

A Wolf in Sheep's Clothing charted three times on the Billboard Hot Dance Music/Club Play chart in 1992 with "The Choice Is Yours (Revisited)" (#9), and "Strobelite Honey" (#1). Black Sheep was also featured on the remix of Vanessa Williams's single "Work to Do" (#8). The group's relationship with its label, Mercury/PolyGram, allowed Dres to establish a boutique label through which he could sign his own acts. Mercury distributed the imprint, which was called One Love, through PolyGram's Independent Label Sales division rather than PolyGram Group Distribution. However, only one full-length title was ever released, the only album by affiliated act The Legion, titled Theme + Echo = Krill from 1994.

The group's second album, Non-Fiction, was released later that year. Because of virtually no promotion and a generally poor reception, the album managed only lackluster sales. Black Sheep broke up shortly after its release.

Aftermath
Dres was featured on the second Handsome Boy Modeling School album White People, on the track "First...and Then." In 2006, Dres released an online-only album titled 8WM/Novakane, under the name Black Sheep, but with Lawnge only appearing on a few tracks on the album. 8WM stands for Women with Women with Weed with Wine with Me. According to a 2006 article on AllHipHop.com, Mista Lawnge changed the spelling of his name to Mista Long. He also released a mixtape called The Class of 89 in 2006. Dres appeared on the 1990s remix of Nas' February 2007 song "Where are They Now?"

In 2008, the single "The Choice is Yours (Revisited)" was ranked number #73 on VH1's 100 Greatest Hip Hop Songs. The song was featured in a commercial for the 2010 Kia Soul.

Discography

Studio albums

As lead artist

Albums

Singles and EPs
 "Flavor of the Month" (1991)
 "Flash's theme (remix)" on Flash Gordon reissue (Sept 1991)
 "The Choice Is Yours (Revisited)" (Oct 1991)
covered by several artists including Trik Turner, Bloodhound Gang, and the Deftones
(Used in the 2010 Kia Soul "Rapping Hamsters" commercial)
 "Strobelite Honey" (1992)
 "Similak Child" (1992)
 "Without a Doubt" (1994)
 "North South East West" (1995)
 Redlight, Greenlight (EP) (recorded 2000, released 2002)

Music videos
 Black Sheep - "Flavor of the Month" (1991)
 Black Sheep - "The Choice Is Yours" (1991)
 Black Sheep - "Strobelite Honey" (1992)
 Vanessa Williams ft. Black Sheep - "Work to Do (Remix)" (1992)
 Showbiz & A.G ft. Black Sheep - "Bounce Ta This" (1992)
 Black Sheep - "Similak Child" (1992)
 The Legion featuring Dres - "Jingle Jangle" (1993)
 Black Sheep - "Without a Doubt" (1994)
 Black Sheep - "Work to Do"

Notes

References

External links
Dres of Black Sheep interview
Dres of Black Sheep on Myspace.com
Mr. Long's (formerly Mista Lawnge) Solo site 
Last Black Sheep Interview as group

American musical duos
Hip hop duos
Hip hop groups from New York City
Mercury Records artists
Musical groups from North Carolina
Musical groups established in 1989
Musical groups disestablished in 1995
Native Tongues Posse
People from Sanford, North Carolina